Andrea Pellegrino was the defending champion but lost in the quarterfinals to Flavio Cobolli.

Juan Manuel Cerúndolo won the title after defeating Cobolli 6–2, 3–6, 6–3 in the final.

Seeds

Draw

Finals

Top half

Bottom half

References

External links
Main draw
Qualifying draw

Garden Open II - 1